National Route 303 is a national highway of Japan connecting Gifu, Gifu and Wakasa, Fukui in Japan, with a total length of .

History
On 14 November 2018, the Japan Ground Self-Defense Force was conducting a military exercise in Takashima, Shiga near Route 303, when they accidentally hit the road with a live 81 mm mortar round. The resultant explosion caused fragments of pavement flying, some of which struck a parked car with an elderly man inside it. The man was not injured, but the car was covered in dents and some windows were shattered.

See also

References

National highways in Japan
Roads in Fukui Prefecture
Roads in Gifu Prefecture
Roads in Shiga Prefecture